Songs from the Hermetic Theatre is an album of contemporary classical music by American composer and saxophonist/multi-instrumentalist John Zorn.

Reception

The Allmusic review by Thom Jurek awarded the album 4 stars stating "Songs From the Hermetic Theater may not be every Zorn fan's cup of gasoline, but almost none of his records are: he's written so much for so many different kinds of musical groupings it's difficult to have an affinity for them all -- but it is a thoroughly rewarding and enriching collection of new works. This set adds even more depth and dimension to an artist who has become unstoppable not only in his output, but in his vision for modern music".

Writing for Pitchfork Media, Brent S. Sirota stated "Hermetic Theatre is the no-hassle, easy-to-follow, four-step program for achieving that tenuous, bi-polar, paranoid, quasi-hallucinatory handle on living... The antidote to dying miserably".

Track listing
All compositions by John Zorn
 "American Magus" - 14:10
 "In the Very Eye of Night" - 11:21
 "The Nerve Key" - 9:36
 "BeuysBlock" - 16:14

Personnel
Jennifer Choi - violin
John Zorn - electronic and computer music, bass, water, drum, flute, glass bowl, metal pipes, wax paper, mud, staple gun

References

2001 albums
Albums produced by John Zorn
John Zorn albums
Tzadik Records albums